The Christophe Plantin Prize (French: Prix Christoffel Plantin), is a Belgian civilian prize, intended to reward a Belgian citizen who resides abroad, who has made significant contributions to cultural, artistic or scientific activities.

Named after noted printer Christophe Plantin, the prize was created in 1968 on the initiative of:
Dr. Baron Ludo van Bogaert, doctor
Baron Roger Avermaete, writer
Hugo van Kuyck, architect
Maurits Naessens, banker
OJ Van de Perre, industrialist

Funded by voluntary contributions, the prize consists of a 10,000 € fund and a medal created by Antwerp artist May Néama. On one side the medal has a portrait of Christoffel Plantin, accompanied by his statement: "I have more hope in posteriority than in the current world population." To the reverse is an old picture of Antwerp quays, with a compass and another statement of Plantin: "Labore and Constantia."

Winners

References

External links
Christophe Plantin Prize website

Civil awards and decorations of Belgium
1968 establishments in Belgium
Awards established in 1968